If I'm Lucky is a 1946 American musical comedy film directed by Lewis Seiler and starring Vivian Blaine, Perry Como, Phil Silvers and Carmen Miranda in the leading roles. The film also featured bandleader Harry James.

The film was a re-make of Thanks a Million, a 1935 musical produced and released by 20th Century Fox.

Plot 
Band agent Wally Jones sends telegrams to members of a band he represents, which is presently "between engagements;" leader Earl Gordon is blowing bugle at a race track, singer Linda Farrell is selling tickets at a movie theater, harpist Michelle O'Toole is working as a hat-check girl and other band members are playing golf. They are all instructed to go to Centerville, where Wally has arranged for them to audition for the Titan Tire Company's president, Mr. Gillingwater, who wants new talent for his company's radio show. When the band arrives in Centerville, however, they are told by Wally that Gillingwater has hired Benny Goodman instead. Although they have hotel rooms for the night, they are low on cash and contrive to get a free meal at a "Magonnagle for Governor" political rally. The small crowd pays paying little attention to the candidate until Earl and the band start playing, so Magonnagle hires the band to accompany him on the rest of his campaign tour. Magonnagle is running with the slogan, "A Vote for Magonnagle Is a Vote for the Common Man," but has little hope of beating the political machine that is backing corrupt, incumbent Governor Quilby. Composer Allen Clark shows up at one campaign stop, wanting to sell the band a song he has written. Earl buys the song for Linda, but Allen really wants to join the band as a singer. Wally finally hires him, partly to help carry his girl friend Michelle's harp. At one rally, Magonnagle is too drunk to speak and Allen delivers a brief pitch on his behalf. Mark Dwyer, a member of the corrupt State Campaign Committee decides to drop the ineffectual Magonnagle and instead run Allen as a candidate to avoid accusations of fraudulent election practices. Allen doesn't want to be involved, but Wally convinces him that it would be good exposure for his singing talents. Dwyer then introduces Allen to several political appointees, who are all cronies of his, and dupes him into signing continuing "appointments" for them. Allen does so, as he, too, fully expects Quilby to win. After Allen and Linda fall in love, Gillingwater asks the band to join his radio show, and Wally negotiates a thirty-nine-week contract at $10,000 per week. To Allen's surprise and distress, however, the polls indicate that he could win the election. Despite further inducements from the political machine, Allen wants to quit, but Dwyer threatens to break them all by revealing the phony "appointments." To protect them, Allen dismisses the band. Magonnagle then returns and tells Linda about the political crooks backing Allen, and thinking that Allen has become one of them, she leaves with the band. In his closing campaign speech, prompted by Magonnagle, Allen denounces Dwyer and his political machine. Linda and the band hear Allen's speech on their bus's radio and return to help him escape from Dwyer. With Allen safely on board, the bus is pursued by police. When the police finally catch up with the bus, they inform Allen that Quilby has conceded the election to him. His friends convince Allen that he can be both governor and radio singer.

Production 
If I'm Lucky offered Perry Como the most significant of his three roles for 20th Century Fox. This film's working titles were That's for Me and You're for Me. Edgar Buchanan was borrowed from Columbia Pictures for the production. According to the Twentieth Century-Fox Records of the Legal Department, the Batucada number was the last sequence to be shot and was photographed by Joseph La Shelle. The picture is very similar to the 1935 Twentieth Century-Fox production Thanks a Million, but neither credits nor studio information acknowledge that If I'm Lucky is a remake of the earlier film.

That was also the last film of Carmen Miranda with Fox, ending her contract with the studio. In April 1947, Perry Como terminated his 20th Century Fox contract.

Cast
 Vivian Blaine as Linda Farrell
 Perry Como as Allen Clark
 Harry James as Earl Gordon
 Carmen Miranda as Michelle O'Toole
 Phil Silvers as Wallingham M. 'Wally' Jones
 Edgar Buchanan as Darius J. Magonnagle
 Reed Hadley as Jed Conklin, Magonnagle's Campaign Manager
 Lewis Russell as P.H. Gillingwater 
 Harry James and His Music Makers as Themselves (as Harry James' Music Makers)

Soundtracks
All the songs for the film, were written  by the team of Josef Myrow and Edgar de Lange and were generally weak affairs. Como's recording of "If I'm Lucky" was a minor hit, reaching #19 in the Hit Parade and spending one week in the charts.

 "Follow the Band" performed by Phil Silvers, Carmen Miranda, Vivian Blaine and Harry James
 "If I'm Lucky" performed by Perry Como and Vivian Blaine
 "One More Kiss" performed by Perry Como
 "Bet Your Bottom Dollar" performed by Vivian Blaine and Carmen Miranda
 "Batucada" performed by Harry James and Carmen Miranda
 "One More Vote" performed by Perry Como

Critical reception 
Los Angeles Times film critic Edwin Schallert said: “Notwithstanding the length to which it goes to present a plausible story, ‘If I’m Lucky’ is not much above the wholly nonsensical.” New York Times film critic Bosley Crowther said: “All sorts of half-witted fancies are regularly popping up in the plots of musical pictures, but one of the silliest we’ve ever struck is in the story of Twentieth Century-Fox’s ‘If I’m Lucky,’ at the Victoria!” Nelson Bell, writing in The Washington Post, said that the film was aimed "strictly at thoughtless and ephemeral diversion" while others dismissed the plot as no more than a vehicle for transporting the audience from one musical scene to another.

DVD release 
The film was released on DVD in June 2008 as part of Fox's "The Carmen Miranda Collection."

References

External links 
 
 
 
 
 If I'm Lucky at NNDB
 
 
 

1946 films
20th Century Fox films
American black-and-white films
1946 musical comedy films
American musical comedy films
1940s English-language films
1940s American films